Wallern im Burgenland is a town in the northeastern part of Burgenland in Austria.

Population

References

Cities and towns in Neusiedl am See District